Trance & Acid is Kai Tracid's second artist album, released on 8 February 2002. The album features Jade 4U on vocals. The album's singles were "Tiefenrausch (The Deep Blue)", "Too Many Times", "Life Is Too Short", and "Trance & Acid", the title track.

Track listing

References

External links
Kai Tracid - Trance & Acid at Discogs

Kai Tracid albums
2002 albums